Torneos de Verano (Spanish for "Summer Tournaments") are a series of short friendly football pre-season tournaments held during the southern summer in Argentina every year, usually in January and February. They serve as preparation for the teams for the season coming; however, as the years went by the competitiveness in the tournaments increased, and they are now considered as important competitions. This is clearly reflected in the high crowd attendance for the games.

Since the first edition in 1968, the Torneos de Verano have been uninterruptedly played, then being expanded to other cities of Argentina such as Córdoba, Mendoza, Rosario and Tandil among others.

History 

The first competition was established by then Boca Juniors president Alberto Armando, who had showed his interest in moving the main Primera División teams to the city of Mar del Plata, the biggest seaside beach resort in Argentina. As a result, two competitions were held in the city in 1968, with the games played at General San Martín Stadium, the main venue of the city by then. The first of them, "Copa Libertad" was held in January 1968, with San Lorenzo as winner of a tournament also contested by Boca Juniors, Rosario Central and Uruguayan side Peñarol.

Another competition, "Copa Ciudad de Mar del Plata", was held in February. The Hungarian team Vasas – which the de facto government led by Juan Carlos Onganía did not want to allow to enter the country due to Hungary being under communist rule – was the winner after beating favorites Racing Club de Avellaneda (current Intercontinental champion) and River Plate (3–0 in the final).

In 1969 the "Copa de Oro" had its inaugural season as a friendly tournament between Argentine and foreign clubs. In its first edition, Brazilian Palmeiras, Austrian SK Rapid Wien, Hungarian MTK Budapest and Czechoslovakian Slovan Bratislava participated of the tournament, together with Boca Juniors, Estudiantes L.P., and the Mar del Plata XI team. Later editions only had Brazilian, Uruguayan or Paraguayan teams, with occasional European clubs or national teams, mainly Hungary and Czechoslovakia. Since the 1980s it has only 3 to 5 Argentine teams, which varied from year to year, but included the Big Five (Boca Juniors, Independiente, Racing, River Plate and San Lorenzo) and sometimes Estudiantes and Vélez Sársfield. Even though they coexisted for several years, the "Copa Ciudad de Mar del Plata" eventually replaced the Copa de Oro as the most important summer tournament. The "Torneo Pentagonal de Verano" (previously "Copa de Verano"), in which the Big Five participate, was the most important tournament and usually took place in Mar del Plata until 2009. Copa de Oro is the longest competition, with 40 editions held between 1969 and 2017.

When Estadio José María Minella was built for the 1978 FIFA World Cup, summer competitions moved to that venue since 1979, leaving General San Martín Stadium for regional competitions only, until it was demolished in 1996.

In January 1995, Maradona made his debut as manager of Racing in a Torneo de Verano match v arch-rival Independiente. Maradona was still banned by FIFA and he had arrived in Racing Club to coach the team until the term of the ban expired so he could resume his career as player in the club. Nevertheless, the tenure of Maradona on Racing did not last so long (only 11 matches) before leaving the club.

The "Copa Desafío" and Copa Revancha" are currently one-match cups disputed only between Boca Juniors and River Plate. Other cups are organized by cities or sponsors, but their continuity is more irregular. Some are organized without any of the Big Five. For instance, the "Ciudad de Córdoba" includes clubs from the Córdoba Province, and occasionally some from Santa Fe Province; and the "Copa Ciudad de Tandil" or "Copa del Sur" includes teams from the southern area of the Gran Buenos Aires: Arsenal, Quilmes, Lanús, Gimnasia y Esgrima (LP), and occasionally a guest like Rosario Central.

After several years of being host in San Juan, in 2022 the seat of summer tournaments moved to La Plata, with only one competition held, being named simply "Torneo de Verano". It was contested by six teams, four from Argentina and two from Chile.

Famous matches 

The summer tournaments in Argentina have had some memorable matches during their more than 50 years of existence. The Hungarian team Vasas – which the de facto government led by Juan Carlos Onganía did not want to allow to enter the country due to Hungary being under communist rule – was the winner after beating favorites Racing Club de Avellaneda (current Intercontinental champion) and River Plate (3–0 in the final).

In 1979, River Plate beat Czechoslovakia national team (then European champions and touring on Argentina) 4–1. Two years later, Talleres de Córdoba defeated Hungary national team 3–0 in Mar del Plata. In 1986, River Plate beat Poland national team 4–2, scoring two goals in the last three minutes of the match. Enzo Francescoli scored three goals, the last of them with a bicycle kick.

The summer of 1999 saw how Boca Juniors easily beat River Plate 3–0 in the Copa Revancha match at Estadio Malvinas Argentinas, Mendoza, with three goals scored by Martín Palermo. In 2000, Boca beat River 2–1, with a starting lineup that included ten players from the youth academy. That defeat caused manager Ramón Díaz resigned after that match.

In Copa Luis Nofal, held on January 31, 2015, in Estadio Malvinas Argentinas, Boca Juniors thrashed River Plate 5–0, achieving the largest win in a friendly Superclàsico.

Non-Argentine teams 

Since the inception of Copa Libertad, the first summer tournament held in Mar del Plata, many South American and European (club and national teams) have participated in Torneos de Verano. 1968 Copa Libertad was contested by Uruguayan side Peñarol. For the 1969 Copa de Oro, Austrian Rapid Wien, Hungarians Slovan Bratislava and MTK Budapest and Brazilian Palmeiras arrived in Mar del Plata to compete.

European teams contesting the other tournament organised in 1968, "Copa Ciudad de Mar del Plata", were Hungarian club Vasas (which would be the winner) and the Czechoslovakia national team. A Mexican team, Necaxa, was invited for the 1970 "Copa de Oro", remaining as the only team from that country to have participated in Argentine summer competitions. The following editions would be contested only by Argentine clubs until 1975, when Paraguayan Olimpia took part.

Czechoslovakia returned to Argentina for the 1979 edition of Copa de Oro. The Czech combined, that had won the European Nations Cup in 1975, finished 2nd. to River Plate. Brazilian club Internacional was the other non-Argentine team that took part of the friendly competition. One year later, the Hungary B national team was invited to participate. The side finished 2nd. to Indpendiente.

Hungary also took part of the 1981 edition, playing with its main team, but the squad made a poor performance, with three loses and a draw, finishing last. Following the practise initiated, another East Europe side invited to summer tournaments was Poland in 1986. German side Köln participated in 1988, being the last participation of a European team to date.

Since 2009, South American teams have been often guests to summer tournaments. In 2009, Club Libertad (Paraguay), San Martín de Porres (Peru) and Defensor Sporting (Uruguay) took part of Copa Santa Fe, a regional competition in Santa Fe Province. In the inaugural season of Copa Ciudad de Rosario in 2011, Alianza Lima (Peru) and Universidad Católica (Chile) were the guest teams. The next edition, FBC Melgar from Peru was the only guest team.

It was not until 2020 when a non-Argentine team took part of summer tournaments again. In that year, several South American sides contested several friendly matches or competitions. Uruguayan club Nacional made its debut in Torneos de Verano winning the Copa Desafío, while Peruvian club Universitario and Club Athletico Paranaense (Brazil) participated in Copa San Juan (in the homonymous city). On the other side, Liverpool (Uruguay) took part of "Copa Wanora Romero" in Córdoba.

After a hiatus due to COVID-19 pandemic in Argentina in 2021, the summer tournaments came back in 2022 with a unique competition held in Estadio Jorge Luis Hirschi of Estudiantes de La Plata. Chilean sides Universidad de Chile and Colo-Colo took part of the tournament along with local clubs Boca Juniors, Independiente, and San Lorenzo.

List of champions

Titles by team

Notes

References

Football competitions in Argentina
Argentine football friendly trophies
1968 establishments in Argentina